American country music singer Kellie Pickler has released four studio albums, one compilation album, 12 singles, and 11 music videos.

Kellie Pickler's debut album Small Town Girl was released in October 2006, and has been certified gold by the RIAA for U.S. sales of 500,000 copies. It produced three Top 20 singles on the Billboard Hot Country Songs charts in "Red High Heels", "I Wonder" and "Things That Never Cross a Man's Mind". Her first single of her self-titled second album is "Don't You Know You're Beautiful", which was followed by "Best Days of Your Life", her first Top Ten hit, and "Didn't You Know How Much I Loved You". "Makin' Me Fall in Love Again" was released as the fourth single in April 2010. A Christmas song, "Santa Baby", released on the Hear Something Country Christmas album, charted from unsolicited airplay in late 2007.

Her third studio album, 100 Proof, was released January 24, 2012 and produced two low-charting singles: "Tough" in 2011 and the title track in 2012. In late 2012, Pickler signed a new contract with Black River Entertainment and released her fourth album's lead single, "Someone Somewhere Tonight" the following spring; "Little Bit Gypsy" and "Closer to Nowhere" followed. The album, The Woman I Am, was her lowest-charting record on the Billboard Top Country Albums chart but topped the Independent Albums chart.

Albums

Studio albums

Compilation albums

Singles

Promotional singles

Music videos

Other album appearances

Notes

References

Country music discographies
Discographies of American artists
American Idol discographies